Siby is a department or commune of Balé Province in southern Burkina Faso. Its capital lies at the town of Siby. According to the 1996 census the department has a total population of 12,089.

Towns and villages
Largest towns and villages and populations in the department are as follows:

 Siby	(3 723 inhabitants) (capital)
 Ballao	(1 165 inhabitants)
 Bitiako	(1 192 inhabitants)
 Boromissi	(736 inhabitants)
 Kalembouly	(1 190 inhabitants)
 Sécaco	(2 516 inhabitants)
 Sorobouly	(632 inhabitants)
 Souho	(935 inhabitants)

References

Departments of Burkina Faso
Balé Province